Aleteia is an online Catholic news and information website founded in 2011/2012 by Jesús Colina via the Foundation for Evangelization through the Media. It has the approval of the Pontifical Council for Social Communications and the Pontifical Council for Promoting the New Evangelization.

The President of the foundation is Olivier Bonnassies, Bruno Riviere de Precourt. Members and Paolo Padrini are active in managing the Spanish site. The English site is operated under Editor-in-Chief Fr Patrick Mary Briscoe, OP.

The organization is based in France but operates in different languages and states worldwide. It is distributed in eight languages and editions (English, French, Portuguese, Spanish, Italian, Arabic, Polish and Slovenian).

References

Catholic media
Multilingual news services
News agencies based in France
Catholic websites